Globicephala  etruriae is an extinct species of pilot whale from the Pliocene of Italy. The type specimen was found in the Piacenzian coastal claystone at Volterra. It was named in 1987 by G. Pilleri.

References

etruriae
Pliocene animals of Europe